Balakrishnabuwa Ichalkaranjikar (1849–1926) was an Indian vocalist of the Khyal genre of Hindustani classical music. He learned the Gwalior gharana (singing style) and brought it to Maharashtra.

Life
Balakrishnabuwa Ichalkaranjikar was born in Maharashtra.

He travelled to Gwalior, then the centre of the Khayal genre of Indian classical music, and studied under Vasudeorao Joshi. He then returned to Maharashtra, and settled near Miraj because its climate suited him. Soon Miraj and the nearby area became a hub of Hindustani classical music, which it has remained since.

Buwa's chief disciples included Neelakanthbuwa Mirajkar, Vishnu Digambar Paluskar, his son Annabuwa (who predeceased him), Anant Manohar Joshi (Antu-buwa), Mirashi buwa and Vamanbuwa Chafekar.

References

1849 births
1926 deaths
Hindustani singers
Singers from Maharashtra
Gwalior gharana
19th-century Indian male classical singers
Indian music educators
20th-century Indian male classical singers
20th-century Khyal singers